Gabriel Delmotte (5 February 1876 – 10 March 1950) was a French astronomer, deputy and Mayor of Masnières in the Nord department in northern France.

He was the author of Recherches sélénographiques et nouvelle théorie des cirques lunaires, which was published in 1923 in Paris.

The crater Delmotte on the Moon is named after him.

Sources 
Data from French Assemblée nationale
Gabriel Delmotte, a french astronomer, specialist of the Moon

1876 births
1950 deaths
People from Nord (French department)
Politicians from Hauts-de-France
Independent Radical politicians
Members of the 14th Chamber of Deputies of the French Third Republic
Mayors of places in Hauts-de-France
20th-century French astronomers